James Alvar Ridge (born 6 February 1943) is a former English cricketer.  Ridge was a left-handed batsman who bowled left-arm medium pace.  He was born at Ashton Keynes, Wiltshire.

Ridge made his Minor Counties Championship debut for Wiltshire in 1966 against Berkshire.  From 1966 to 1973, he represented the county in 26 Minor Counties Championship matches, the last of which came against Dorset.

Ridge also represented Wiltshire in List A matches.  His debut List A match came against Essex in the 1969 Gillette Cup.  His second and third List A matches both came against Hampshire in the 1972 and 1973 Gillette Cup.  In his 3 List A matches, he scored 12 runs at a batting average of 4.00, with a high score of 10.

References

External links
James Ridge at Cricinfo
James Ridge at CricketArchive

1943 births
Living people
People from Wiltshire
English cricketers
Wiltshire cricketers